Richard Collins (1947 – April 15, 2013) was a Canadian actor. He was best known for playing Philadelphia "Phil" Collins in the comedy series Trailer Park Boys. In 2011, he also appeared as Big Ron in The Drunk and On Drugs Happy Fun Time Hour. Other notable roles include the role of "Uncle Joe" in Snake Eater, "Rosie" in the movie Siege, an appearance in the episode 'Luvliner' of the series Lexx, and various small appearances in movies and tv shows such as Matters of Life and Dating and Shattered City: The Halifax Explosion.

Collins was born in St. John's, Newfoundland and lived in Halifax, Nova Scotia, for most of his life. He died of a heart attack in Halifax on April 15, 2013, at the age of 66, during the filming of Trailer Park Boys: Don't Legalize It. The film is dedicated to him, Rita MacNeil (who died the next day), Brian Huggins, Brian Ryan and Bill Parsons.

Filmography

Film

Television

References

External links
 

1947 births
2013 deaths
Canadian male television actors
Male actors from Halifax, Nova Scotia
Male actors from Newfoundland and Labrador
People from St. John's, Newfoundland and Labrador